Edgar Rickard (January 17, 1874 – January 21, 1951) was a mining engineer and lifelong confidant of U.S. President Herbert Hoover.

Biography

Family
He was the son of mining engineer Reuben Rickard, and the brother of Thomas Rickard, a mining engineer and one-time mayor of Berkeley, California.  
He was born on January 17, 1874, in Pontgibaud, France.

Carrier
For many years around the turn of the century, he was the editor of a mining journal in London.

Diary
Rickard maintained a diary. Due to his close connection with President Herbert Hoover, Rickard's diary has become an important source of information about Hoover.

Death
Rickard died on January 21, 1951 in San Francisco, California.

References

American mining engineers
1874 births
1951 deaths
American expatriates in the United Kingdom
French emigrants to the United States